Attilio Bulgheri (9 March 1913 – 23 December 1995) was an Italian professional footballer who played as a goalkeeper.

References

1913 births
1995 deaths
Italian footballers
Serie A players
F.C. Grosseto S.S.D. players
U.S. Livorno 1915 players
U.S. Alessandria Calcio 1912 players
Juventus F.C. players
Association football goalkeepers